Ralph Gretzmacher is an Austrian scientist, professor of botany, zoology and an expert on tropical and subtropic agronomy.

The Austrian Representative for the European Coordination Group to Food and Agriculture Organization of the United Nations, he was a former Head of the Austrian Delegate to Consultative Group on International Agricultural Research, he completed his doctoral studies from the University of Natural Resources and Life Sciences, Vienna in 1968.

Career
Gretzmacher has published scientific and academic papers for more than 40 years in the field of soil science and agronomy in Europe. He won the Adolf Schärf Prize in 1974.

In 2006, Gretzmacher led the project called Benefiting from an improved agricultural portfolio in Asia by the European Commission of the European Union (EU); formerly, he also led agricultural research projects in Namibia, Ethiopia, Kenya, Palestine and various other countries in Europe and Asia, as well as serving as a member of the Austrian Council of Asean-European University Network.

Bibliography

 Ashebir, D; Jezik, K; Weingartemann, H; Gretzmacher, R(2009): Change in color and other fruit quality characteristics of tomato cultivars after hot-air drying at low final-moisture content. Int. J Food Sci Nutr. 2009; 60: 308-315.
 Schmidt, M; Wei, W; Polthanee, A; Lam, NT; Chuong, S; Qiu, LJ; Banterng, P; Dung, PT; Glaser, S; Gretzmacher, R; Hager, V; de Korte, E; Li, YH; Phuong, NT; Ro, S; Zhang, ZY; Zhou, HF(2008): Ambiguity in a trans-disciplinary stakeholder assessment of neglected and underutilized species in China, Cambodia, Thailand and Vietnam. BIODIVERS CONSERV. 2008; 17(7): 1645-1666.
Alemayehu Balcha, Gretzmacher, R., Vollmann, J.(2006): Genetic variation in nitrogen-use efficiency of tef,. J PLANT NUTR SOIL SC, 169, 704-710; ISSN 1436-8730
Balcha, A., Gretzmacher, R., Vollmann, J.(2005): Genotypic variation for nitrogen utilization efficiency in tef [Eragrostis tef (Zucc.) Trotter] seedlings. J GENET BREED, 59, 27-32; ISSN 0394-9257
N. Ghunheim, R. Gretzmacher(2005): Optimierung des Wassereinsatzes bei Erdbeere (Fragaria ananassa) im Gaza-Streifen/Palestina. In: A. Kämpf, W. Claupein, S. Graeff, W. Diepenbrock - Gesellschaft für Pflanzenbauwissenschaften: 48. Jahrestagung: "Wasser und Pflanzenbau - Herausforderungen für zukünftige Produktionssysteme", 27. bis 29. September 2005, Wien, 17, 259-260; Günter Heimbach, Stuttgart; ; ISSN 0934-5116
Balcha, A., Gretzmacher, R., Vollmann, J.(2003): Estimation of genetic parameters for grain yield and yield related traits in tef [Eragrostis tef (Zucc.) Trotter]. Journal of Genetics and Breeding, 57, 251-257
 Nahar, K., Gretzmacher, R.(2002): Effect of water stress on nutrient uptake, yield and quality of tomato (Lycopersicon esculentum Mill.) under subtropical conditions. Die Bodenkultur, 53, 1, 45-51
 Sinebo, W., R. Gretzmacher, A. Edelbauer(2002): Environment of selection for grain yield in low fertilizer input barley. Field Crop Research 74, 151-162
Stockinger, K., Vogl, C.R., Gretzmacher, R.(2002): Agroforestry Systems and Practices in Austria: Neglected but Powerful Examples for Potential Innovations in Organic Farming Systems in Temperate Climatic Regions.. In: Thompson, R. (Ed.), "Cultivating communities", 14th IFOAM Organic World Congress, 21. -24.8.2002, Victoria, Canada, 146; Canadian Organic Growers, Ottawa, Ontario, Canada in the 14th IFOAM Organic World Congress "Cultivating communities", Victoria, British Columbia, Canada, 21. -24.8.2002
Tariqul Islam, M., R. Gretzmacher(2001): Grain growth pattern and yield performance of some transplanted aman rice cultivars in relation to moisture stress. The Bangladesh Journal of Nuclear Agriculture, 16/17, 21-28
Sinebo, W., Gretzmacher, R.(1999): Variety, fertilisers, weed control and clover mixture effects on bread wheat in Ethiopia. Die Bodenkultur, 50, 3-9
 Gretzmacher, R., Schabazian, N.(1998): Improving the productivity of winter wheat in Iran through rotation of wheat, fallow, soybean and alfalfa and manuring.. Die Bodenkultur, 49, 151-157
 Czerwenka-Wenkstetten, I.M., Berner, K.K., Schilder, A., Gretzmacher, R.(1997): First Report and Pathogenicity of Myrothecium roridum, Curvularia eragrostidis and C. Iunata on seeds of Striga hermonthica in Nigeria.. Plant Disease, 81, 7, 832
 Darnhofer, I., Gretzmacher, R., Schneeberger, W.(1997): Modeling farmers' decisions for oats-vetch adaption in the Ethiopian Highlands. Die Bodenkultur, 48, 4, 271-280
 Vollmann, J; ElHadad, T; Gretzmacher, R; Ruckenbauer, P(1996): Seed protein content of soybean as affected by spatial variation in field experiments. PLANT BREED. 1996; 115(6): 501-507
 Gretzmacher, R., Schahbazian, N., Pourdavai, N.(1994): Einfluß von symbiontischem, organischem und anorganischem Stickstoff auf Ertrag und Qualität von Sojabohnen.. Die Bodenkultur, 45, 3, 253-267
Vollmann, J., Gruber, H., Gretzmacher, R., Ruckenbauer, P.(1992): Note on the efficiency of artificial hybridization in soybean.. Die Bodenkultur, 43, 123-127

Gretzmacher, R., H. Gruber, Vollmann, J.(1992): Results of a soybean research programme sponsored by the Austrian Ministry of Agriculture.. Poster, FAO Research Network on Soyabean, Sept. 2-4. 1992, Technical Meeting
Gretzmacher, R.(1991): Umweltzerstörung durch den Bevölkerungsdruck am Beispiel Thailand.. Veröffentlichungen der Kommission für Humanökologie, Österreichische Akademie der Wissenschaften, 167-183
 Gretzmacher, R., T. Wolfsberger(1990): Die Bewässerungseffizienz bei Sojabohne (Glycine max L.Merr.), untersucht in Groß-Enzersdorf an der Sorte Evans in den Jahren 1980 bis 1989.. Die Bodenkultur, 41, 2, 125-135
 Gretzmacher, R.(1987): Untersuchungen mit Stecklingen der Batate (Ipomoea batatas (L.) Lam) in bezug auf eine optimale Vermehrungsrate.. Die Bodenkultur, 38, 2, 135-145
Gretzmacher, R.(1981): Die Produktion von Hirse (Sorghum bicolor (L) Moech) im Sudan.. Die Bodenkultur, 32, 1, 13-34
Gretzmacher, R.(1979): Die Abhängigkeit des Ertrages der Einzelpflanze und des Bestandes bei der Kartoffel (Solanum tuberosum L.) von der Pflanzenzahl je Fläche.. Die Bodenkultur, 30, 1, 21-40
Gretzmacher, R.(1979): Das Ertragsverhalten von Sommergerste (Hordeum vulgare L.) und Durumweizen(Triticum durum Desf.) auf unterschiedliche Saatstärken einer experimentellen Breitsaat.. Die Bodenkultur, 30, 2, 151-180
Gretzmacher, R.(1979): Die Beeinflussung des morphologischen Ertragsaufbaues und der Ertragsleistung durch den Standraum bei Körnermais.. Die Bodenkultur, 30, 3, 256-280
Gretzmacher, R.(1978): Der Einfluß verschiedener Bestandesdichten auf die Struktur und Höhe des Ertrages von Paprika (Capsicum annuum L.) im Gewächshaus und Freiland.. Gartenbauwissenschaft, 43, 3, 97-103
Gretzmacher, R.(1978): Die Reaktion der Sojabohne (Glycine max.(L.) Merr.) auf unterschiedlichen Bestandesdichten.. Die Bodenkultur, 29, 4, 333-350
Gretzmacher, R.(1978): Ein Beitrag zur Entstehung von Kalkkrusten an Hand von Untersuchungen an Böden Südost-Spaniens.. Die Bodenkultur, 21, 2,111-126
Gretzmacher, R.(1977): Untersuchungen über die Möglichkeit einer mechanisierten landwirtschaftlichen Großproduktion im East Central State (Nigeria).. Die Bodenkultur, 28, 3, 303-324
Gretzmacher, R.(1977): Einfluß von pH-Wert, Eisen-Konzentration und Wurzelverletzung auf Wachstum und Mineralstoffgehalt von Rebstecklingen in Nährlösungen.. Mitt. Klosterneuburg, 27, 5, 207-214
Gretzmacher, R., Tanasch, L.(1976): Soybean breeding in Austria.. Soybean Genetics Newsletter 3
Gretzmacher, R.(1975): Standraumuntersuchungen bei Buschbohne (Phaseolus vulgaris L. var.nanus Asch.). II. Teil: Untersuchungen an rechteckigen Standräumen.. Die Bodenkultur, 26, 2, 163-174
Gretzmacher, R.(1974): Sojaanbau in Österreich ?. Agrarische Rundschau, 1974, 1, 55-58
Gretzmacher, R.(1974): Möglichkeit einer Sojaproduktion in Österreich. Lebensmittel und Ernährung, 27, 9, 201-205
Gretzmacher, R.(1974): Standraumuntersuchungen bei Buschbohne (Phaseolus vulgaris L. var.nanus Asch.). Untersuchungen an quadratischen Standräumen.. Die Bodenkultur, 25, 4, 392-406
Gretzmacher, R.(1973): Untersuchungen über die Wirkung von Wurzelverletzungen bei Karfiol (Brassica oleracea var. cauliflora).. Die Bodenkultur, 24, 1, 40-50
Gretzmacher, R.(1972): Untersuchungen über die Wirkung der Hackarbeit bei Rotkraut (Brassica oleracea var. capitata L.).. Gartenbauwissenschaft, 37, 3, 179-189
Gretzmacher, R.(1972): Die Wirkung der Hackfrucht.. In: Universität f. Bodenkultur Wien (Hrsg.): 100 Jahre Hochschule für Bodenkultur in Wien. 18.-19. Okt. 1972. Band 3: Vorträge der Studienrichtung Landwirtschaft, Studienzweig Pflanzenproduktion, Teil 1: Allgemeine Fachvorträge, 207-219
Gretzmacher, R.(1970): Erfahrungen mit dr Kultur von Weinreben (Vitis vinifera L.) in Nährlösungen.. Die Bodenkultur, 21, 2,111-126

Lectures (Unpublished)
Gretzmacher, R. (2004): The Republic South Africa., 18.02.2004, Kasetsart Universität, Bangkok, Thailand
Gretzmacher, R. (2004): Worldwide agriculture - principles, development and comparison of influences from climate up to politics., 18.02.2004, Kasetsart Universität, Bangkok, Thailand
Gretzmacher, R. (2003): Grundlagen und Entwicklung der Landwirtschaft in der 3. Welt. Vorlesung im Lehrgang für Akademische Orient-Studien and der Orient Akademie, 15.-17.05.2003, Wien, Österreich
Gretzmacher, R. (2003): International agriculture with respect to geographic environment. Vorlesung, Sokrates/Ersamus-Dozentenmobilität, 25.09.2003, Süd-Böhmische Universität Budweis, Ceske Budejovice, Tschechien
Owino, J., R. Gretzmacher (2002): Performance of Narrow Strips of Vetiver Grass (Vetiveria zizanioides) and Napier Grass (Pennisetum purpureum) as Barriers against Runoff and Soil Sediment Loss on a Clay Loam Soil (Andosol) in Kenya. Deutscher Tropentag, 9.-11. Oktober 2002, Universität Kassel, Witzenhausen, Deutschland
Vollmann, J., T. Moritz, H. Wagentristl, P. Ruckenbauer, R. Gretzmacher (2001): Genetic improvement of oil content in camelina. Annual Meeting, Crop Science Society of America, 21.-25. Okt. 2001, Charlotte, NC, USA
Gretzmacher, R. (2000): Introduction to the tropics, subtropics and agronomy.. Introduction to alpine agriculture, 21. und 22. September 2000, Agricultural College Hvanneyri, Iceland
Gretzmacher, R. (2000): Pflanzenbau: Technologien für die chinesische Landwirtschaft.. China-Informations-tage an der Universität für Bodenkultur Wien, 30. Mai 2000, Wien
Bozza, G., Gretzmacher, R., Vollmann, J. (1994): The influence of sunlight and heat on inoculation.. Poster, Technical Meeting of the FAO European Network on Soyabean, Padua/Italien, 23. September
Gretzmacher, R., Schahbzian, N. (1994): Verbesserung der Eiweiß- und Ölversorgung im Iran durch Steigerung der Sojabohnenerträge mittels Optimierung der Inoculation mit Knöllchenbakterien und der organischen Düngung.. Endbericht Iran-Projekt Nr. 66, Kommission für Entwicklungsfragen bei der österreichischen Akademie der Wissenschaften
Vollmann, J., Gruber, H., Hanifi-Moghaddam, K., Gretzmacher, R., Ruckenbauer, P. (1992): New ideas to improve the efficiency of hybridization in soybean.. In: Reproductive Biology and Plant Breeding, Book of Poster Abstracts, XIIIth EUCARPIA Congress, July 6–11, 1992, Angers, France, 307-308

See also
Food security
Intensive farming
Agricultural Production

Further Study

References

External links
Prof.i.R. Dipl.-Ing. Dr. Ralph Gretzmacher at BOKU
Ralph Gretzmacher at Mendeley

Living people
Scientists from Vienna
Year of birth missing (living people)